Chamban (also Romanized as Chambān and Cham Bon) is a village in Saroleh Rural District, Meydavud District, Bagh-e Malek County, Khuzestan Province, Iran. At the 2006 census, its population was 89, in 17 families.

References 

Populated places in Bagh-e Malek County